Target is a 1952 American Western film directed by Stuart Gilmore and starring Tim Holt.

Plot
In 1893 Pecos, Texas, two cowhands join forces with a lady marshal.

Cast
Tim Holt - Tim Holt
Mary Jo Tarola - Terry Moran (as Linda Douglas)
Walter Reed - Martin Conroy
Harry Harvey - Editor David Carson
John Hamilton  - Rancher Bailey
Lane Bradford - Henchman Garrett
Riley Hill - Henchman Foster
Mike Ragan - Henchman Higgins
Richard Martin - Chito Jose Gonzalez Bustamonte Rafferty

References

External links 
 

1952 films
1952 Western (genre) films
American Western (genre) films
Films set in Texas
Films set in 1893
RKO Pictures films
Films scored by Paul Sawtell
American black-and-white films
1950s English-language films
1950s American films